Thor Eisentrager is a founding member and former guitarist for the Minneapolis-based Noise rock-outfit, the Cows. After the release of the Cows's ninth album, Sorry in Pig Minor, Thor announced that he had grown tired of touring and left the band. The remaining members disbanded shortly thereafter. He is currently retired from the music business and works as the assistant director of security for the Minneapolis Institute of Art. After several years of working at the Minneapolis Institute of Art he left in 2019. He now works as the Manager of Public Safety at St Catherine University.

Musical style and influence
His approach to guitar playing has been noted as adding to the band's diverse sound. His style was also described as sounding as if he "played with metal files." Unlike the other members of the Cows, Thor was mostly influenced by the Blues, favoring such artists as Muddy Waters and The Rolling Stones. He was also known to bring hand-written notation into band practice.

References

1958 births
Living people
Lead guitarists
American rock guitarists
American male guitarists
Post-hardcore musicians
Noise rock musicians
Guitarists from Minnesota
American noise musicians
Cows (band) members
20th-century American guitarists
20th-century American male musicians